David Wellington (born 1963) is a Canadian film and television director, best known for the films I Love a Man in Uniform and the 1996 adaptation of Long Day's Journey into Night.

He has also directed episodes of the television series The Hidden Room, The Eleventh Hour, Queer as Folk, Saving Hope, Rookie Blue and Orphan Black.

His brother Peter is also a film and television director, who along with David, directs for Saving Hope.

Filmography
The Carpenter (1988)
I Love a Man in Uniform (1993)
Long Day's Journey into Night (1996)
Of Murder and Memory (2008)
Would Be Kings (2008)

References

External links
 

1963 births
Film directors from Ontario
Canadian television directors
20th-century Canadian screenwriters
Living people
Canadian Film Centre alumni
20th-century Canadian male writers
21st-century Canadian screenwriters
21st-century Canadian male writers
Canadian male screenwriters